Saint-Côme-de-Fresné is a commune in the Calvados department in the Normandy region in northwestern France.

Population

See also
Communes of the Calvados department

References

Saintcomedefresne
Calvados communes articles needing translation from French Wikipedia